Eye On Sports is a Jamaican sports talk television show, hosted by Dahlia Harris and Patrick Anderson. It airs Thursdays on TVJ at 8:30pm after the prime time news broadcast. The hosts and a panel of experts analyse and discuss sports news, including athletics, aquatic sports, and more. It also focuses on issues surrounding athletes, coaches, infrastructure and legal battles.

External links

See also
 Smile Jamaica
Jamaican television series
Television Jamaica original programming